Aaronsburg may refer to:

 Aaronsburg, Ohio
 Aaronsburg, Centre County, Pennsylvania
 Aaronsburg, Washington County, Pennsylvania